Tomasz Kasprzik (born 2 January 1993 in Pyskowice) is a Polish footballer who most recently played for ŁTS Łabędy.

Career

Club
In the summer 2010, he was loaned to Olimpia Elbląg.

In January 2011, he was loaned to LZS Leśnica on a half year deal.

National team
He was a part of Poland national under-18 football team.

References

External links 
 

1993 births
Living people
Polish footballers
Piast Gliwice players
People from Pyskowice
Sportspeople from Silesian Voivodeship
Association football goalkeepers